Dave Boughton is an Australian former professional rugby league footballer who played professionally in England and Australia.

Playing career
Boughton was an Engadine Dragons junior in the Cronulla-Sutherland District Rugby Football League. In 1991 he made his first grade début for the Cronulla Sharks. He played 82 games for the club between 1991 and 1996 before signing for the new Adelaide Rams franchise in 1997. Boughton was part of the inaugural Rams side on 1 March 1997 and played in seventeen matches for the club over two seasons.

After being the subject of a bidding war between Newcastle and Huddersfield, Boughton signed for the Huddersfield Giants for the 1999 season. He played in twenty seven matches that year before retiring.

References

1970 births
Living people
Australian rugby league players
Australian expatriate sportspeople in England
Cronulla-Sutherland Sharks players
Adelaide Rams players
Huddersfield Giants players
Rugby league second-rows
Rugby league locks
Rugby league players from Sydney